The 1st Council of the North-West Territories, also known as the North-West Council in Canada, lasted from October 7, 1876, to 1888. It was created as a permanent replacement to the Temporary North-West Council which existed prior to 1876.

A 2nd Council of the North-West Territories was elected in 1888. It was replaced in 1891 by the 1st North-West Assembly when the quota of elected members was reached.

(A different 2nd Council of the Northwest Territories (1905-1951) was created in 1905, when the NWT lost most of its population, to differentiate the new one from the two legislative councils of the NWT that had existed 1876 to 1891.)

Early history and development
The first members of the new council were appointed under the Northwest Territories Act and consisted of the Lieutenant Governor, appointed men and Stipendiary Magistrates. Elected representatives were added later and could join the council if an area of  had 1000 people an electoral district could be set up. This created a patchwork of represented and unrepresented areas, and there was no official or independent boundaries commission; all electoral law at the beginning was under the purview of the Lieutenant Governor.

Three electoral districts were created in 1881 and for an unknown reason writs were only issued in the district of Lorne which returned the first elected member Lawrence Clarke.

Electors participating in the Northwest Territories elections did not vote by secret ballot until the 1893 Whitewood by-election.

Early sessions
When the first council formed under the new appointed government in 1876, the council consisted of  the lieutenant governor who acted as the chairman (speaker), and two appointed members. Because a quorum could not be maintained, the council had to be adjourned if one member went to the washroom.

Elections
Numerous elections took place during the period of 1876–1891 - 11 separate by-elections electing one or two members, 9 by-elections held on one day in September 1885 (1885 Northwest Territories election), and the 1888 North-West Territories general election. 

The election of 1885 took place on September 15, 1885. The election saw 11 members in 9 new districts returned to the council, due to high rate of population growth in the North-west Territories at the time. 

After the 1885 election, elected members became the majority in the council vis a vis the appointed members, although they had to fight to wrest control from the "colonial" officials. It became a full assembly. 

The other elections, other than the 1888 general election, are not considered general elections, as there was no dissolution of the assembly - not all the members were up for election. However, after three years from an election, a district had to have another election - the seat was declared empty to be filled in an election.

For list of elected members please see below.

By-election dates and summaries

March 23, 1881 Lorne by-election #1
Election summary

May 29, 1883 Edmonton by-election
Election summary -- Frank Oliver elected

June 5, 1883 Lorne by-election #2
Election summary

August 13, 1883 Moose Jaw, Regina, Qu'Appelle sub-election
Election summary

August 31, 1883 Broadview by-election
Election summary

June 28, 1884 Calgary, Moose Mountain by-election
Election summary

(1885 Northwest Territories election -- almost a dozen by-elections were held in September 1885)

July 8, 1886 Moose Mountain by-election #2
Election summary

July 14, 1886 Calgary, by-election #2
Election summary

October 14, 1886 Qu'Appelle by-election #2
Election summary

May 24, 1887 Qu'Appelle by-election #3
Election summary

September 5, 1887 Macleod by-election
Election summary

Legislative session dates
1st Legislative Session, March 8, 1877, to March 22, 1877
2nd Legislative Session, July 10, 1878, to August 2, 1878
3rd Legislative Session, August 28, 1879, to September 22, 1879
4th Legislative Session, May 26, 1881, to June 11, 1881
5th Legislative Session, August 20, 1883, to October 4, 1883
6th Legislative Session, July 3, 1884, to August 16, 1884
7th Legislative Session, November 5, 1885, to December 18, 1885
8th Legislative Session, October 13, 1886, to November 19, 1886
9th Legislative Session, October 14, 1887, to November 19, 1887

Elected members of the 1st Council of the Northwest Territories
For complete electoral history, see individual districts

Appointed members of the 1st Council of the Northwest Territories

See also
List of Northwest Territories premiers
List of Northwest Territories commissioners
List of Northwest Territories lieutenant-governors
List of Northwest Territories general elections

References

External links
Electoral history of the Legislative Assembly of the Northwest Territories 1876 - 1905
History of the Lt. Governor of the Northwest Territories
Photo of the 1886 Legislature

Northwest Territories Legislative Assemblies
Elections in the Northwest Territories
Northwest Territories